Mixed lineage kinase domain like pseudokinase (MLKL) is a protein that in humans is encoded by the MLKL gene.

Function

This gene belongs to the protein kinase superfamily. The encoded protein contains a protein kinase-like domain; however, is thought to be inactive because it lacks several residues required for activity. This protein plays a critical role in tumor necrosis factor (TNF)-induced necroptosis, a programmed cell death process, via interaction with receptor-interacting protein 3 (RIP3), which is a key signaling molecule in necroptosis pathway. Inhibitor studies and knockdown of this gene inhibited TNF-induced necrosis.

Influence in diseases

High levels of this protein and RIP3 are associated with inflammatory bowel disease in children. Alternatively spliced transcript variants have been described for this gene. [provided by RefSeq, Sep 2015]. Some reports have linked it to unusual variants of multiple sclerosis

See also 

Necroptosis
Cell death

References

Further reading